The 2014 Porsche Carrera Cup Great Britain was a multi-event, one make motor racing championship held across England, France and Scotland. The championship featured a mix of professional motor racing teams and privately funded drivers, competing in Porsche 911 GT3 cars that conformed to the technical regulations for the championship. It was a multi class championship, with drivers grouped based on their ability and experience into three classes: Professional, Professional-Amateur 1 (Pro-Am 1) and Professional-Amateur 2 (Pro-Am 2). It formed part of the extensive program of support categories built up around the BTCC centrepiece. The 2014 season was the twelfth Porsche Carrera Cup Great Britain season, commencing on 30 March at Brands Hatch – on the circuit's Indy configuration – and concluded on 12 October at the same venue, utilising the Grand Prix circuit, after 19 races at 10 meetings. 18 of the races were held in support of the 2014 British Touring Car Championship season, with the other race in support of the 2014 24 Hours of Le Mans.

For the majority of the season, the championship battle revolved around Redline Racing team-mates Josh Webster and Michael Meadows, running under the Samsung UHD TV Racing banner. Meadows won more races than Webster – Meadows with nine overall wins plus a further two class wins, while Webster took five overall wins with a further class win – but Webster's greater consistency allowed him to take the overall championship by nine points, ahead of the two-time defending champion Meadows. Webster finished each race as one of the best three finishers in class, including the overseas round at Le Mans, where he was seventh overall. Third place in the championship went to Paul Rees, who took a race victory at Rockingham, and three further podium finishes. The only other drivers to take race victories were Ben Barker, who achieved an overall victory at Le Mans – as well as two victories in the guest car in the opening Brands Hatch round – and Daniel Cammish, who took a win in the guest car at the final round. Redline Racing were comfortable winners of the teams' championship, finishing almost 200 points clear of In2Racing, the next best team.

In the Pro-Am championships, Justin Sherwood won the Pro-Am 1 title by 41 points, largely due to him competing in more rounds of the series than any other driver in the class. Only twice did a Pro-Am 1 driver reach the overall podium, as Karl Leonard achieved a second-place finish at Donington Park, while Pepe Massot took a third-place finish at Croft. Massot was later regraded as a professional driver after his strong performances at Croft, and in qualifying at Snetterton. In Pro-Am 2, although Peter Kyle-Henney scored more championship points in total, the best seven rounds scoring system allowed Steven Liquorish to claim the championship title by a single point. Liquorish took six race wins over the course of the season, while Kyle-Henney took four wins. Third place went to three-time winner Will Goff, with two wins each for Carol Brown at Knockhill, Paul Donkin at Croft, and Emmerdale actor Kelvin Fletcher, who achieved his double at Silverstone.

Entry list
For the 2014 season, a new car was utilised with the introduction of the seventh generation Porsche 911 – the Porsche 991 – to replace the Porsche 997 model.

Race calendar and results
The calendar was announced by the championship organisers on 23 September 2013. The championship reduced from 20 rounds in 2013 to 19 rounds, after the inclusion of a single joint race, with the Porsche Carrera Cup France, in support of the 2014 24 Hours of Le Mans, replacing the races at Oulton Park. The French round was only the second time the championship has held an international round, after the 2011 race in Germany.  All other rounds were held in support of the 2014 British Touring Car Championship season and featured two races at each meeting.

Notes

Championship standings

Drivers' championships

Overall championship

Notes
† — At Le Mans, Víctor Jiménez did not finish the race but was classified for completing over 90% of the race distance.

Pro-Am championships

Notes
1 — Pepe Massot scored pole position points towards the Pro-Am 1 championship standings at Snetterton, before being regraded as a professional driver for the races.

References

External links
 

Porsche Carrera Cup
Porsche Carrera Cup Great Britain seasons